Polk Robison coached the Texas Tech Red Raiders basketball teams from 1942 through 1946 and 1947 through 1961, before stepping down to become the athletic director for the Texas Tech Red Raiders. Robison became the second head coach to coach the Red Raiders in nonconsecutive terms. Robison compiled a 254–195 record.  Under Robison, the Red Raiders won two conference championships, one co-championship and earned their first bid to the NCAA tournament.

1942–43

Source:

1943–44

Source:

1944–45

Source:

1945–46

Source:

1947–48

Source:

1949–50

Source:

1950–51

Source:

1951–52

Source:

1952–53

Source:

1953–54

1954–55

1955–56

1956–57

The 1956–57 was the first season the Red Raiders played in Lubbock Municipal Coliseum.
Source:

1957–58

Source:

1958–59

Source:

1959–60

Source:

1960–61

References

Texas Tech Red Raiders basketball seasons